Choiseul Bay is a bay in the northwestern part of Choiseul Island, Solomon Islands, at .

See also
 Raid on Choiseul

References

- neutral review of this book here:

Bays of the Solomon Islands